Dream: Japan GP Final, also known as  Dream Japan GP – 2011 Bantamweight Japan Tournament Final, was a mixed martial arts event held by Fighting and Entertainment Group's mixed martial arts promotion Dream. The event took place on July 16, 2011 at the Ariake Coliseum in Tokyo, Japan.

Background
The Kenji Osawa-Keisuke Fujiwara fight was planned as a qualifier for the worldwide Dream bantamweight Grand Prix later that year.

Willamy Freire suffered a hand injury during training that forced him out of his bout with Kawajiri. He was replaced with Drew Fickett.

Todd Duffee was scheduled to face Nick Gaston at this event, but was forced out of the bout due to an undisclosed injury.

Hayato Sakurai was scheduled to fight Marius Žaromskis at this event, however an unspecified leg injury forced him out of the bout. Žaromskis instead faced Eiji Ishikawa at a catchweight of 79 kg (175 lbs).

Results

Japan Bantamweight Grand Prix 2011 Bracket

References

2011 in mixed martial arts
Dream (mixed martial arts) events
Sports competitions in Tokyo
Mixed martial arts in Japan
2011 in Japanese sport